The Tishomingo National Wildlife Refuge is a National Wildlife Refuge of the United States located in Oklahoma. It is in southern Johnston and northeastern Marshall Counties in the eastern part of the state, near the upper Washita arm of Lake Texoma.

The refuge was established in 1946 and contains 16,464 acres (66.3 km²) of protected land managed by the Fish and Wildlife Service.

Purpose 
The purpose of this wildlife refuge is to protect wildlife as well as the land and plants. Hunting and fishing are allowed with the appropriate licenses. 

No entrance fee is required. The refuge headquarters on site has maps, brochures, and more history and information over the refuge.

External links
Tishomingo National Wildlife Refuge - USFWS

Protected areas of Johnston County, Oklahoma
Protected areas of Marshall County, Oklahoma
National Wildlife Refuges in Oklahoma